NVC community SD17 (Potentilla anserina - Carex nigra dune-slack community) is one of the 16 sand-dune communities in the British National Vegetation Classification system.

It is one of five communities associated with dune slacks.

It is a very localised community. There are four subcommunities.

Community composition

The following constant species are found in this community:

 Creeping Bent (Agrostis stolonifera)
 Common Sedge (Carex nigra)
 Silverweed (Potentilla anserina)
 Pointed Spear-moss (Calliergon cuspidatum)

No rare species are associated with the community.

Distribution

This community is found in two areas - on the east coast, from Spurn Point to northwest Norfolk, and on the dunes of Liverpool Bay.And north Wales.

Subcommunities

There are three subcommunities:
 the Festuca rubra - Ranunculus repens subcommunity
 the Carex flacca subcommunity
 the Caltha palustris subcommunity
 the Hydrocotyle vulgaris - Ranunculus flammula subcommunity

References

 Rodwell, J. S. (2000) British Plant Communities Volume 5 - Maritime communities and vegetation of open habitats  (hardback),  (paperback)

SD17